is a Japanese voice actress represented by I'm Enterprise. She is best known for her role as Makoto Kikuchi in The Idolmaster game series. She was featured as a guest of honor at Anime Expo 2004. In video games, she voices Mao in Disgaea 3, Kamui Tokinomiya in Arcana Heart, and Miyabi in the Senran Kagura series.

Filmography

Anime

Video games

Discography

Albums

References

External links

 Official agency profile 
 

Living people
Japanese voice actresses
1978 births
Voice actresses from Hiroshima Prefecture
21st-century Japanese actresses
21st-century Japanese women singers
21st-century Japanese singers
I'm Enterprise voice actors